Abdullah Nahar (born 31 March 1981) is a former Kuwaiti footballer who was played as a forward for Al Kuwait & Al Fahaheel.

References

1981 births
Living people
Kuwaiti footballers
Footballers at the 2002 Asian Games
Sportspeople from Kuwait City
Association football forwards
Asian Games competitors for Kuwait
AFC Cup winning players
Kuwait international footballers
Al-Fahaheel FC players
Kuwait SC players
Kuwait Premier League players